Gianluca Pollace (born 25 December 1995) is an Italian football player.

Club career
He made his Serie B debut for Salernitana on 2 October 2015 in a game against Crotone.

References

External links
 

1995 births
Footballers from Rome
Living people
Italian footballers
S.S. Lazio players
U.S. Salernitana 1919 players
A.S. Gubbio 1910 players
S.S. Racing Club Roma players
A.S.D. Sicula Leonzio players
Serie B players
Serie C players
Association football defenders